Viridifusus is a genus of sea snails, marine gastropod mollusks in the family Fasciolariidae, the spindle snails, the tulip snails and their allies.

They occur in the Atlantic Ocean off West Africa and the Cape Verdes.

Species
Species within the genus Viridifusus include:
 Viridifusus albinus (A. Adams, 1856)
 Viridifusus buxeus (Reeve, 1847)
 Viridifusus maximus (G.B. Sowerby III, 1893)
 Viridifusus mollis (G. B. Sowerby III, 1913)

References

 Snyder M.A., Vermeij G.J. & Lyons W.G. (2012) The genera and biogeography of Fasciolariinae (Gastropoda, Neogastropoda, Fasciolariidae). Basteria 76(1-3): 31-70
 Vermeij G.J. & Snyder M.A. (2018). Proposed genus-level classification of large species of Fusininae (Gastropoda, Fasciolariidae). Basteria. 82(4-6): 57-82.

Fasciolariidae